The Estadio Martínez Valero is a stadium located in the Spanish city of Elche in the province of Alicante, Valencian Community. It is the home stadium of Elche CF, a team that is currently playing in La Liga. Its name pays tribute to the late president of the club, Manuel Martínez Valero. It hosted the largest rout in the finals of a World Cup and hosted the final of the Copa del Rey in 2003. The Spanish football team has played several friendly matches and competitive qualifiers there. The stadium has the largest field dimensions in Europe.

With a capacity of 31,388 seats, Martínez Valero is the 15th-largest stadium in Spain and the 2nd-largest in the Valencian community.

History 
The Martínez Valero Stadium was inaugurated on 8 September 1976, replacing the former Campo de Altabix, which was constructed in 1923. It was designed by the architect Juan Boix Matarredona, and is currently the largest sports arena in the province of Alicante. The inaugural match was Elche CF v. the Mexico National Team, which ended in a 3–3 tie. Elche CF's goals were scored by Finarolli, Orellana and Gomez Voglino. It was one of 17 stadiums where matches took place in the 1982 FIFA World Cup. On June 15, 1982, it was the venue as Hungary achieved a record winning margin in World Cup history, beating El Salvador 10–1 before a crowd of 23,000. In addition, the Martinez Valero Stadium hosted the final of the Copa del Rey for the 2002–03 season. It is listed by UEFA as a four-star UEFA Elite Stadium.

In the 2013–2014 season the stadium received the AFEPE (organization which unites fan clubs of all Spanish clubs) Award for Best La Liga Stadium.

International matches

Spain national team matches

1982 FIFA World Cup
The stadium was one of the venues of the 1982 FIFA World Cup (known as the Nuevo Estadio at the time of the tournament), and held the following matches:

Gallery

References

External links

Estadios de Espana 
Stadium Guide Article

Football venues in the Valencian Community
Rugby union stadiums in Spain
1982 FIFA World Cup stadiums
Elche CF
Multi-purpose stadiums in Spain
Buildings and structures in the Province of Alicante
Elche
Sports venues completed in 1976